Aleksey Vladimirovich Shevchenkov is a Russian actor. Merited Artist of the Russian Federation (2006). He appeared in 130 films.

Biography
Aleksey was born on November 2, 1974. He studied acting at the Russian State Institute of Performing Arts. In 1997, he began working at the Moscow Drama Theater under the direction of Armen Dzhigarkhanyan, and since 2010 he has been an actor at the Moscow Art Theater named after A.P. Chekhov. In 1994 he made his film debut.

Selected filmography

References

External links 
 Aleksey Shevchenkov on kino-teatr.ru

1974 births
Living people
People from Chernyakhovsk
Russian male film actors
Russian male television actors
Russian male stage actors
20th-century Russian male actors
21st-century Russian male actors
Honored Artists of the Russian Federation
Russian State Institute of Performing Arts alumni